Est. on April 1, 2007, the Interactive & Digital Media Centre (Abbreviation: IDMC@SP), is an organization in Singapore Polytechnic that seeks to help Singapore enterprises (especially SMEs) to advance their use of Interactive & Digital Media (IDM). Launched in 2007, the vision behind IDMC@SP was to be a centre of excellence for R&D work in the areas of Interactive & Digital Media. IDM projects are submitted to IDM Programme Office and IDA, and MOE for R&D funding.

Unreal Technology (UT) Living Lab

See also
 Ministry of Information, Communications and the Arts (Singapore)
 Media Development Authority of Singapore
 Infocomm Development Authority of Singapore
 SPRING Singapore
 Singapore Polytechnic
 Government of Singapore
 Economy of Singapore

References

External links
Interactive & Digital Media Centre Homepage
IDM Programme Office
IDA Digital Media & Entertainment
Infocomm@SME Programme (IDA)
SME Infocomm Resource Centre Homepage

Business organisations based in Singapore